Rankl is a surname. Notable people with the surname include:

George Rankl (1867–?), American politician
Karl Rankl (1898–1968), Austrian-British conductor and composer

See also
 RANKL (Receptor activator of nuclear factor kappa-B ligand)